Ian Moss  is the seventh studio album by Australian musician Ian Moss. The album was announced in November 2017 alongside a national tour commencing in June 2018. and is Moss’s first solo album in nine years and his first of all original material in 22 years. The album was produced by Peter Walker, who also produced Cold Chisel's self-titled debut in 1978.

The album was released in March 2018 and peaked at number 11 on the ARIA Charts, becoming Moss's second highest charting solo album in his career.

Recording
Moss said, "I started doing some recording in Nashville, but discovered that you could have your great, raw material songs, but then after that, the arrangement can really make or break things. And that's where I thought Peter Walker really came into his own. Peter produced the first Cold Chisel album all those years ago. He has got a fantastic ear for arrangement.

Reception
Stack Magazine said "This is his finest solo album" singling out "Broadway" as an instant classic and other highlights "Down Along the Track" and "If Another Day". Simon Collins from The West Australian said ".. his soulful voice and supple fret-work across 11 classic rock songs imbued with snatches of soul, blues and country." calling the album "Top shelf".

Track listing

Charts

Release history

References

2018 albums
Ian Moss albums